Rowland Fernyhough (born 9 July 1954) is a British equestrian. He competed in the team jumping event at the 1976 Summer Olympics.

References

External links
 

1954 births
Living people
British male equestrians
Olympic equestrians of Great Britain
Equestrians at the 1976 Summer Olympics
Place of birth missing (living people)
Welsh equestrians